Zhang Xian (990–1078) was a Song Dynasty artist in China.

He created Ten Odes based on Zhang Wei's own "ten beloved poems written on white silk."

Zhang Xian's Illustrating Ten Poems (Shiyong tu) (Song dynasty) now are in the Palace Museum collection.

According to the Chinese Tour Guide website:

References

990 births
1078 deaths
Song dynasty poets
Writers from Huzhou
11th-century Chinese poets
Song dynasty painters
Painters from Zhejiang
Poets from Zhejiang